Roy Joseph Sitch (3 November 1915 – 6 April 1956) was an Australian rules footballer who played with North Melbourne in the Victorian Football League (VFL).

Family
The son of Percival Sitch (1896-1965), and Euphemia Morgan Sitch (1891-1964), née Thomson, Roy Joseph Sitch was born at North Melbourne, Victoria on 3 November 1915.

He married Thelma Joan Schofield (1922-1998) in Kelso, New South Wales, in August 1946.

Military service
In January 1934, he attempted to enlist in the Militia, but was rejected on medical grounds; he has a "large untreated hydrocele".

He enlisted in the Second AIF in December 1941, and served until his discharge in 1946.

Death
He died at Kalkallo, Victoria on 6 April 1956. A football match to raise funds for Sitch's family was played at Coburg between teams from North Melbourne and Coburg on 12 August 1956.

Notes

References
 
 Taking it Off Their Toes, The Sporting Globe, (Wednesday, 16 August 1939), p.11.
 The Pack flies High, The Sporting Globe, (Saturday, 12 August 1939), p.5.
 Old Players at Coburg, The Argus, (Friday, 15 March 1946), p.6.
 World War Two Nominal Roll: Lance Sergeant Roy Joseph Sitch (VX67516), Department of Veterans' Affairs.
 B883, VX67516: World War Two Service Record: Roy Joseph Sitch (VX67516), National Archives of Australia.

External links 
 
 
 Roy Sitch, at The VFA Project

1915 births
1956 deaths
Australian rules footballers from Melbourne
North Melbourne Football Club players
Coburg Football Club players
People from North Melbourne